Grothaus is a surname. People with this surname or its variants include:

 Eleonore von Grothaus (1734–1794), German noblewoman, writer, poet, lay musician, educator
 Gisela Grothaus (born in Berlin), West German slalom canoeist
 Michael Grothaus (born 1977), American novelist and journalist
 Edward Bernard Grothus (1923-2009), American anti-nuclear activist
 Theodor Grotthuss (1785-1822), German chemist

Surnames